The European Culture Collections' Organisation (ECCO) is a European non-profit organisation which promotes the collaboration and exchange of ideas and information on all aspects of culture collection activity. Corporate members of ECCO are microbial resource centres of countries with microbiological societies affiliated to the Federation of the European Microbiological Societies (FEMS).

History
The organisation of the European Culture Collections' Organisation (ECCO) was established in 1981.

See also
 American Type Culture Collection (ATCC)
 World Federation for Culture Collections

Sources
 ECCO
 B. E. Kirsop, C. P. Kurtzman, T. Nakase, D. Yarrow, Living Resources for Biotechnology : Yeasts, 1988, p. 208
 D. L. Hawksworth, B. E. Kirsop, S. C. Jong, Filamentous Fungi (Living Resources for Biotechnology), 1988, pp. 182–183

External links
 ECCO

Culture collections
Microbiology organizations
Pan-European scientific societies